Barkha Sonkar (24 December 1996) is an Indian women's international basketball player. She is a member of India women's national basketball team and represented India in "2017 FIBA Women's Asia Cup Division B"

Early life and education
She was selected for the IMG Reliance scholarship programmes in the US for schooling and training.
Studied high school at IMG Academy Bradenton, Florida, and graduated from IMG Academy in 2016, after that went to Hillsborough Community College, played for hawks (National Collegiate Athletic Association) for 2 years.

Currently playing for Lindsey Wilson College, Kentucky

Championship
During the 2017 FIBA Asia Cup held at Sree Kanteerava Stadium, Bengaluru, Barkha played well and India defeated Kazakhstan by 75-73. Barkha has been top 3rd player in the match.

References

External links 

Living people
1996 births
Indian women's basketball players
Basketball players from Uttar Pradesh
Basketball players from Varanasi
Lindsey Wilson Blue Raiders women's basketball players
Hillsborough Hawks women's basketball players
Husson Eagles
Indian expatriate basketball people
Indian expatriate sportspeople in the United States
Expatriate basketball people in the United States
South Asian Games gold medalists for India
South Asian Games medalists in basketball